Euscorpiops shidian is a species of scorpion in the Euscorpiidae family, first found in Tibet and Yunnan, China.

References

Further reading
Di, Z. Y., et al. "The scorpions of Yunnan (China): updated identification key, new record and redescriptions of Euscorpiops kubani and E. shidian (Arachnida, Scorpiones)." ZooKeys 82 (2011): 1-33.
Sun, Dong, and Ming-Sheng Zhu. "One new species of scorpion belonging to the genus Euscorpiops Vachon, 1980 from Yunnan, China (Scorpiones: Euscorpiidae, Scorpiopinae)." Zootaxa 2399 (2010): 61-68.

Euscorpiidae
Scorpions of Asia
Animals described in 2005